Robert Charles Wright (born April 23, 1943) is an American lawyer, businessman, right-wing lobbyist, and author. He is a former NBC executive, having served as president and CEO from 1986 to 2001, and chairman and CEO from 2001 until he retired in 2007. He has been credited with overseeing the broadcast network's expansion into a media conglomerate and leading the company to record earnings in the 1990s. Prior to NBC, he held several posts at General Electric in the 1960s, 70s and 80s. He served as President and CEO of GE Capital, GE Financial Services 1983 to 1986 and served as GE's vice chairman until he retired from that role in 2008.

In 2005, Wright and his late wife, Suzanne Wright, founded Autism Speaks. In 2016, after his wife's death from pancreatic cancer, Wright established the Suzanne Wright Foundation, which funds research for pancreatic cancer. Through the Suzanne Wright Foundation, he is also currently leading an initiative to establish a Health Advanced Research Projects Agency, or HARPA, which would be a government research agency modeled after the U.S. Department of Defense's DARPA.

Early life and education
Wright was born on April 23, 1943, in Hempstead, New York, on Long Island, the only child of Catherine Drum Wright and Gerald Franklin Wright. After graduating from Chaminade High School in Mineola, New York, Wright enrolled at the College of the Holy Cross in Worcester, Massachusetts. He originally studied pre-med, but later changed his studies to major in psychology and minor in history. He graduated with a Bachelor of Arts degree in 1965. Wright earned an LL.B from the University of Virginia School of Law in 1968.

Career

Early career
Wright began his career with General Electric as a staff lawyer in 1969. The following year, he left GE to take a judicial clerkship for a federal judge in New Jersey. Wright joined GE again in 1973 as a lawyer for the company's plastics unit, where he later took on several management positions. GE made a deal to acquire radio, broadcast TV and cable properties of Atlanta, Georgia-based Cox Communications in 1979 and appointed Wright as Cox Cable president and executive vice president of Cox Broadcasting. The deal did not come to fruition, however Wright remained with Cox Cable as president until 1983. Under Wright's leadership, Cox Cable launched franchises across the U.S., including franchises in Omaha, Nebraska, Tucson, Arizona, New Orleans, Louisiana, Vancouver, Washington, suburbs near Chicago, Illinois, and Providence, Rhode Island, and a portion of Long Island, New York. Wright was a contemporary of Ted Turner (Turner Broadcasting Systems), John Malone (TCI), Chuck Dolan (Cablevision Systems) and Ralph J. Roberts (Comcast) during the early days of cable television. Wright left Cox to join GE once again in 1983, when GE chairman and CEO Jack Welch hired him to lead the company's housewares and audio units. He was promoted to president of GE Financial Services from 1984 to 1986.

NBC and NBC Universal
GE named Wright the president and CEO of NBC Broadcasting when the company acquired the broadcast network in 1986. He succeeded Grant Tinker in the role. He became chairman and CEO of NBC in 2001. He was named chairman and CEO of NBC Universal in 2004.

Upon succeeding Tinker, Wright's main mission became finding new areas of business in addition to running a television network, and transformed the network into a media conglomerate. NBC launched CNBC in 1989 and MSNBC in 1996. Both are examples of the strategic partnerships NBC created under Wright to improve distribution and content. CNBC included a partnership with Dow Jones allowing delivery of local business and financial news in Europe and Asia; and MSNBC was a venture with Microsoft that launched a new 24-hour news network and accompanying news website to combine the two mediums.

Wright is credited with leading NBC during a time when the company became a powerful media leader, driving the company to record earnings in the 1990s. The network reported $5 billion in revenues and nearly more $1 billion in operating profits in 1996. Also under Wright, NBC acquired Universal Pictures, Telemundo and Bravo.

In the early- and mid-90s, Wright and NBC led efforts to persuade lawmakers and regulators to relax rules preventing networks from becoming multichannel program providers, obtaining certain financial interests and syndication.

General Electric named Wright as vice chairman of NBC's then-parent company in 2000.

Under Wright, NBC completed its acquisition of Vivendi Universal Entertainment in 2004. Led by Wright, the newly formed NBCUniversal controlled seven cable networks, including USA Network and Sci-Fi Channel); 29 TV stations; film and TV studios; and theme parks.

During his career with NBC, Wright was active in opposing digital piracy, and was a founding member of the Global Leadership Group for the Business Alliance to Stop Counterfeiting and Piracy. In that role, Wright spoke at the Global Congress on Combating Counterfeiting and Piracy in Geneva, Switzerland, pushing for lawmakers and businesses to curb rising intellectual property theft in the digital age, and delivered a speech titled "Technology and the Rule of Law in the Digital Age" at the Media Institute in 2004. He also penned an op-ed in The Wall Street Journal titled "Stop IP theft". Wright's speech at the Media Institute was published in the Notre Dame Journal of Law, Ethics & Public Policy. His 2002 speech for the Legatus Tri-State Chapter on issues of faith and business was reprinted in 50 High-Impact Speeches and Remarks.

Wright retired from NBC in 2007. When Wright first took the helm at the network, it saw operating profits of $400 million. In 2007, when he retired, NBC generated $3.1 billion in profit on $15.4 billion in revenue. He remained vice chairman of GE until his retirement from that role in 2008.

Autism Speaks

One of Wright's grandchildren, Christian, was diagnosed with autism, prompting him and his wife, Suzanne, to found an advocacy group. The couple launched Autism Speaks in 2005, and Wright became its chairman. The Wrights' organization merged with Autism Coalition for Research and Education in 2005, National Alliance for Autism Research in 2006 and Cure Autism Now in 2007. In its first 9 years, Autism Speaks invested a half-billion dollars, focusing on science and research. The organization helped persuade the U.S. government to invest billions in autism research; as of 2014, Congress had dedicated more than $3 billion for autism research and monitoring. During Wright's tenure, the organization teamed up with Google in 2014 on the MSSNG project to sequence a database of autism genomes. Wright resigned as chairman of Autism Speaks in May 2015; as of February 2016, he remained on the board as a co-founder of the organization and on its executive committee. His book, The Wright Stuff: from NBC to Autism Speaks, written with Diane Mermigas, was published March 29, 2016.

The Suzanne Wright Foundation 
Bob Wright is Founder and Chairman of the Suzanne Wright Foundation, established in honor of his late wife, Suzanne, who died from pancreatic cancer on July 29, 2016. The Suzanne Wright Foundation launched CodePurple, a national awareness and advocacy campaign to fight pancreatic cancer. Pancreatic cancer has the highest mortality rate of all major cancers. With no screening tools, the mortality rate is 92% and has seen virtually no improvement in more than 40 years. Through advocacy and awareness, the foundation's goal is to accelerate discovery of detection tools, better treatments, and ultimately, a cure for pancreatic cancer.

The Suzanne Wright Foundation proposes a national health policy initiative to establish HARPA, the Health Advanced Research Projects Agency. HARPA would exist with HHS and leverage federal research assets and private sector tools to drive medical breakthroughs for diseases, like pancreatic cancer, that have not benefited from the current system. HARPA is modeled after the Defense Advanced Research Projects Agency (DARPA), the gold-standard for innovation and accountability. DARPA, an agency within the Department of Defense, developed The Internet, Voice Recognition Technology, GPS navigation, Night vision, Robotic Prostheses, Stealth Technology. DARPA's success proves there is an effective government model for translating science to product. HARPA's identical operating principles, built on urgency, leadership, high-impact investments and accountability, would advance scientific research "from bench to bedside." HARPA would work within an innovation ecosystem that includes: the commercial market; biotech and healthcare companies; venture capital and philanthropy; academic institutions; and other government and regulatory agencies.

On May 22, 2018, The Suzanne Wright Foundation premiered their film The Patients Are Waiting: How HARPA Will Change Lives, in New York City. The film screening was followed by a panel hosted by Maria Bartiromo, Anchor and Global Markets Editor, FOX Business Network – FOX News Channel. Panelists included Bob Wright, Dr. Herbert Pardes, Executive Vice Chairman of NewYork–Presbyterian Hospital; Former Director NIMH, Dr. Geoffrey Ling, Col. (Ret.) Prof. of Neurology, Johns Hopkins; Founder & Former Director, DARPA BTO, Jessica Morris, Co-founder of OurBrainBank, and Karen Reeves, President & CMO, AZTherapies.

Lee Equity Partners
Lee Equity Partners, a private equity firm run by financier Thomas H. Lee, announced in January 2008 that Wright would join the company as a senior advisor. Due to Wright's background with GE Financial Services and NBC, Wright was brought on to advise in media and financial sector deals.

Boards and affiliations
Wright has served on numerous boards, councils and committees. As of February 2016, he sits on the board of directors for Polo Ralph Lauren; Autism Speaks, an autism advocacy group he co-founded with his wife, Suzanne; AMC Networks; Alfred E. Smith Memorial Foundation; and Palm Beach Fellowship of Christians & Jews. He is chairman and CEO of Palm Beach Civic Association. He is a life trustee of the New York-Presbyterian Hospital.

Honors and awards
Wright has accepted various awards and honors during his career in media. He was inducted into the Broadcasting & Cable Hall of Fame in 1996, the Cable Center's Cable Hall of Fame in 2007 and AAF's Advertising Hall of Fame in 2009. He received the "Gold Medal Award" from International Radio & Television Society Foundation in 1997, the "Steven J. Ross Humanitarian of the Year Award" of UJA-Federation of New York in 1998, "Public Service Award" from the Ad Council in 2002, Broadcasters' Foundation's "Golden Mike Award" in 2003, Media Institute's 2004 "Freedom of Speech Award", "Humanitarian Award" from the Simon Wiesenthal Center in 2005, "Distinguished Leadership in Business Award" from Columbia Business School in 2005, and the "Visionary Award" from the Museum of Television & Radio in 2006. He also was awarded the Minorities in Broadcasting Training Program's "Striving for Excellence Award".
Wright and his wife, Suzanne, have been honored for their work with Autism Speaks. They were presented with the first-ever "Double Helix Medal" for Corporate Leadership from Cold Spring Harbor Laboratory, the New York University "Child Advocacy Award", the Castle Connolly "National Health Leadership Award" and the American Ireland Fund "Humanitarian Award". They received the "Dean's Medal" from the Johns Hopkins Bloomberg School of Public Health, the "President's Medal for Excellence" at Boston College's Wall Street Council Tribute Dinner and the "Visionary Award" at the 20th Annual Nantucket Film Festival. The Wrights were named among Time's 100 most influential people in the world in 2008.

Bibliography

Personal life
Wright was married to his wife, Suzanne, from 1967 until her death from pancreatic cancer in 2016. He has three children, Katie, Chris, and Maggie and six grandchildren: Christian, Mattias, Morgan, Maisie, Alex, and Sloan.

See also
The Late Shift

References

External links

Autism Speaks Founders Message

1943 births
American television executives
Autism activists
NBC chief executive officers
Chaminade High School alumni
General Electric people
Living people
NBC executives
NBCUniversal people
American health activists